Cenchrus agrimonioides is a rare species of grass in the family Poaceae that is endemic to the Hawaiian Islands. Its common names include Kāmanomano and agrimony sandbur. It was formerly distributed throughout the major islands but today it is nearly limited to Oahu. Kāmanomano inhabits dry to moist forests and lava plains.  It is threatened by competition with non-native plants, predation by ungulates, and wildfire. When this plant became a federally listed endangered species of the United States in 1996 there were fewer than 100 individuals remaining. More recent counts revealed 181 wild individuals on Oahu and over 300 more which have been planted to augment the populations. This plant is nearly restricted to the island of Oahu, but there are a few individuals known on Maui. A few patches of the grass have been planted on Kahoolawe, as well.

Cenchrus agrimonioides var. laysanensis, a variety of this species endemic to the Northwestern Hawaiian Islands, became extinct in the 1980s. Remaining plants of this species are the variety agrimonioides.

This is a perennial grass which produces is flowers and fruits within spiny burs. These burs attach to animals, which might then disperse the seeds.

References

External links

USDA Plants Profile

agrimonioides
Plants described in 1826
Endemic flora of Hawaii
Endangered flora of the United States
NatureServe critically imperiled species
Taxonomy articles created by Polbot